Alluroididae is a family of annelids belonging to the order Haplotaxida.

Genera:
 Alluroides Beddard, 1894
 Barryjamiesonia Ljunström, 1971
 Brinkhurstia Jamieson, 1968
 Kathrynella Omodeo, 1996
 Righiella Omodeo & Coates, 2001
 Standeria Jamieson, 1968

References

Annelids